Lygdamis, who ruled –484 BCE, was the first tyrant of Caria under the Achaemenid Empire. He was of Carian-Greek ethnicity.  He was the father of Artemisia I of Caria.

He is the founder of the eponymous Lygdamid dynasty (520–450 BCE) of Carian tyrants, who ruled from Halicarnassus.

References

Ancient Halicarnassians
Lygdamid dynasty
Achaemenid satraps of Caria
6th-century BC Asian monarchs
5th-century BC rulers in Asia
Officials of Darius the Great